William J. Donohue (c. 1873 – January 31, 1907) was an American politician from New York.

Life
Donohue was born about 1873, and lived with a wife and two children at 132 Bedford Avenue in Williamsburg, Brooklyn. He was a friend of the local Democratic boss Patrick H. McCarren.

In November 1905, Donohue ran on the Municipal Ownership League ticket for the New York State Assembly, but was defeated. In November 1906, he ran again, this time on the Democratic ticket, and was elected. He was a member of the New York State Assembly (Kings Co., 14th D.) in 1907.

One month into his term, on January 31, 1907, he committed suicide by shooting himself in the head in Edward Lingers's saloon at 419 Oakland Street in Brooklyn.

Sources

1870s births
1907 deaths
People from Williamsburg, Brooklyn
Democratic Party members of the New York State Assembly
Suicides by firearm in New York City
19th-century American politicians
American politicians who committed suicide